The River Cam is a tributary of the River Yeo in the south of Somerset, England.

The Cam rises east of Yarlington.  It flows south west past North Cadbury, Sparkford, Queen Camel and West Camel, and joins the  Yeo near Yeovilton.

Other tributaries include the stream through Blackford and Compton Pauncefoot and benefited from works in the 1980s to the riverbanks in Blackford to help keep the water moving. Flooding in Blackford is rarer than previously, as a result.  This tributary stream has its headwaters in the hills around Blackford and Compton Pauncefoot together with a number of springs.  The main waters come from three primary sources: Maperton, Quarry Hill and Sigwells Hill.  The first two combine in Blackford around the Crossroads/Hollow and further springs contribute at several points all the way through both villages.  The river then travels under the A303 to join the Yarlington headwaters.

The Cam flows onto the Royal Naval Station at Yeovilton where it joins the Yeo, which in turn flows west to the south of Yeovilton and through the town of Ilchester.  The river course continues to the west and at Langport becomes the River Parrett.

In 2009 the river burst its banks at West Camel following flash flooding.

References

External links 

Rivers of Somerset